Seville Grove is a suburb of Perth, Western Australia in the City of Armadale.

Seville Grove used to be part of Armadale proper but was established as a separate suburb in 2002.

It contains a public high school, Cecil Andrews College, as well as a library, a Scout Hall and Swan TAFE's Equine Training Centre. It is served by buses from Armadale and Kelmscott and is close to Sherwood train station.

Seville Grove is home to new housing estates.

References

External links

Suburbs of Perth, Western Australia
Suburbs in the City of Armadale